The 58th Primetime Emmy Awards were held on Sunday, August 27, 2006, at the Shrine Auditorium in Los Angeles, California on NBC at 8:00 p.m. ET (00:00 UTC) with Conan O'Brien hosting the show. The ceremony attracted 16.2 million viewers, 2.5 million fewer than the previous year's ceremony, but still the ratings winner for the week. The Discovery Channel received its first major nomination this year.

This awards show was the first in fourteen years to be held in August because of NBC's request; because of NBC Sunday Night Football, the ceremony moved to accommodate NFL Kickoff Weekend.

A new voting system determined nominees in particular categories (mostly lead acting and outstanding series categories) by a "blue ribbon" panel of judges, which resulted in the exclusion of popular shows such as Desperate Housewives and Lost, and actors like Hugh Laurie from House. Losts exclusion was mocked during the opening sequence (see below), when O'Brien, accompanied by Hugo "Hurley" Reyes, heads down a hatch to get to the Emmys. O'Brien asked Reyes if he wanted to come; Reyes says coyly, "Well, we weren't exactly invited", to which O'Brien replies "But you won last year!"

For its second season, The Office won Outstanding Comedy Series; this was its only major award. No comedy series won more than two major awards this year. In the drama field, 24 won Outstanding Drama Series for its fifth season, after being nominated and losing the previous four years.  It was also the first time the Fox Network won this award.  Its three major awards topped all drama series. Its Outstanding Lead Actor, Drama award (for Kiefer Sutherland) was also the first time Fox had won this award.

Ellen Burstyn was nominated for Outstanding Supporting Actress in a Miniseries or Movie for her role in Mrs. Harris, even though she was onscreen for only fourteen seconds, which caused controversy.

The show that received the most major nominations was Grey's Anatomy, with eight. The top-nominated show had not received so few nominations since 1970, when Marcus Welby, M.D. received six. However, there were far fewer nominations back then, with most categories having three slots making this ceremony unique.

The pilot episode of My Name Is Earl joined a select group of TV episodes to win for both directing and writing.

Winners and nominees
Winners are listed first and highlighted in bold:

Programs

Acting

Lead performances

Supporting performances

Directing

Writing

Most major nominations
By network 
 HBO – 48
 NBC – 27
 CBS – 22
 ABC – 15
 Fox – 10

By program
 Grey's Anatomy (ABC) – 8
 Mrs. Harris (HBO) – 7
 Bleak House (PBS) / Elizabeth I (HBO) / Six Feet Under (HBO) / Will & Grace (NBC) – 6

Most major awards
By network 
 HBO – 10
 NBC – 9
 Fox – 4
 ABC / Comedy Central – 2

By program
 Elizabeth I (HBO) – 4
 24 (Fox) / The Girl in the Café (HBO) – 3

Notes

Presenters and performers

Presenters
The awards were presented by the following people:

Performers

Opening sequence and subsequent controversy

The plane crash Lost parody
The opening sequence of the 58th Primetime Emmy Awards show depicted host Conan O'Brien wearing a tuxedo, sitting in luxury on a plane, sipping champagne and mentioning to the flight attendant that this would be the second Emmy's ceremony that he would be hosting. O'Brien then rhetorically asked the flight attendant, "What could possibly go wrong?" Immediately after that, the plane began to experience turbulence and then was portrayed as having crashed on (or near) an island. O'Brien is then seen walking ashore on the beach and onto the island still wearing his (now drenched) tuxedo. Hurley appears and then follows O'Brien to a hatch. When O'Brien asks if he wants to come along, Hurley says that they "weren't exactly invited". O'Brien enters the hatch and arrives on the set of The Office.

The intention of this opening sequence was to parody the premise of the ABC series Lost. However, the sequence reportedly disturbed some viewers because of the Comair Flight 5191 disaster that had occurred earlier in the day. Cincinnati NBC affiliate WLWT-TV had the unfortunate coincidence of running a "Breaking News" scroll about the crash at the same time as the scene was airing. 

Entertainment industry critics, such as LA Weekly columnist Nikki Finke, lambasted NBC's decision to not pull the plane crash portion of the opening sequence, in light of the aforementioned crash earlier that day. Finke stated that she believed NBC could have—with relative ease—instructed their writers to come up with a different sketch at the last minute, which could have been used as a substitute.

Other parodies
The skit also parodied shows such as The Office, 24, House, South Park, and Dateline NBC (specifically, the "To Catch a Predator" segments). An animated Tom Cruise from the South Park episode "Trapped in the Closet" appears in a skit where an animated O'Brien hides in Stan Marsh's closet, only to run away when he discovers Cruise has already occupied the closet.

Tributes
The show featured tributes to two TV legends: Dick Clark ("America's Oldest Teenager"), and Aaron Spelling, producer of such classic TV shows as Dynasty and Beverly Hills, 90210. The former tribute was presented by Simon Cowell, American Idol judge, with a performance by Barry Manilow, who won a Primetime Emmy Award later that evening. Joan Collins, Heather Locklear, and Stephen Collins, along with the original three Charlie's Angels, gave the tribute for Spelling.

In Memoriam

Dennis Weaver
Barnard Hughes
Mrs. Philo T. Farnsworth
Don Adams
Dan Curtis
Lew Anderson
Ralph Edwards
Curt Gowdy
Robert Sterling
Michael Piller
Red Buttons
Mike Douglas
Scott Brazil
Anthony Franciosa
Phyllis Huffman
Darren McGavin
Gloria Monty
Jan Murray
Pat Morita
Al Lewis
Maureen Stapleton
Buck Owens
Jack Warden
Don Knotts
Robert Wise
John Spencer
Louis Nye
Shelley Winters
Richard Pryor

References

External links
 Official list of all nominees
 Emmys.com list of 2006 Nominees & Winners
 Nikki Finke Asks: "What Was NBC/Conan Thinking?"
 
 Video of the Plane Crash Sequence from the 58th Primetime Emmy Broadcast

058
Conan O'Brien
2006 television awards
2006 in Los Angeles
August 2006 events in the United States